Dufouriini is a tribe of flies in the family Tachinidae.

Genera
Chetoptilia Rondani, 1862
Comyops Wulp, 1891
Dufouria Robineau-Desvoidy, 1830
Ebenia Macquart, 1846
Eugymnopeza Townsend, 1933
Euoestrophasia Townsend, 1892
Jamacaria Curran, 1928
Kambaitimyia Mesnil, 1953
Mesnilana Van Emden, 1945
Microsoma Macquart, 1855
Oestrophasia Brauer & von Bergenstamm, 1889
Pandelleia Villeneuve, 1907
Rhinophoroides Barraclough, 2005
Rondania Robineau-Desvoidy, 1850

References

Brachycera tribes
Dexiinae